Mariusz Stanisław Fyrstenberg (born 8 July 1980) is a retired left-handed Polish tennis player who was a doubles specialist.

Fyrstenberg primarily partnered Marcin Matkowski. The pair won the Madrid Open twice, in addition to reaching the final at the US Open. They also reached the final of the ATP Finals and participated six times at the event overall.

He is currently the coach of Wesley Koolhof, Jan Zielinski and Hugo Nys.

Significant finals

Grand Slam tournament finals

Doubles: 1 (runner-up)

Year-end championships

Doubles: 1 (runner-up)

Masters 1000 finals

Doubles: 6 (2 titles, 4 runner-ups)

ATP career finals

Doubles: 44 (18 titles, 26 runner-ups)

Performance timeline

Doubles

See also
Poland Davis Cup team

External links
 
 
 

1980 births
Polish male tennis players
Living people
Olympic tennis players of Poland
Tennis players at the 2004 Summer Olympics
Tennis players at the 2008 Summer Olympics
Tennis players at the 2012 Summer Olympics
Tennis players from Warsaw